This is a list of public art in Flintshire, north-east Wales. Flintshire borders the English county of Cheshire to the east, Denbighshire to the west and Wrexham County Borough to the south. It is named after the historic county of Flintshire which had very different borders. This list applies only to works of public art on permanent display in an outdoor public space and does not, for example, include artworks in museums.

Bagillt

Buckley

Caergwrle

Caerwys

Connah's Quay

Ffynnongroyw

Flint

Hawarden

Mold

Rhosesmor

References

Flintshire
Flintshire